Moon River and Other Great Movie Themes is the ninth studio album by American pop singer Andy Williams and was released on March 26, 1962 by Columbia Records and covered film songs that were mostly from the previous decade.

The album made its first appearance on Billboard magazine's Top LP's chart in the issue dated May 12 of that year and remained there for 176 weeks (the longest chart run of any of his albums), peaking at number 3.

The album received Gold certification from the Recording Industry Association of America on October 14, 1963, and thus became Williams's earliest recording to achieve this honor but not, however, the first to do so. His Days of Wine and Roses and Other TV Requests album, which was released in April 1963, received its Gold certification just one month prior to this one. By 1967, the album had sold more than two million copies.

Moon River and Other Great Movie Themes was released on compact disc for the first time by Columbia in 1987. It was also released as one of two albums on one CD by Sony Music Distribution on May 15, 2001, the other album being Williams's Columbia album from February 1962, Danny Boy and Other Songs I Love to Sing.

Album concept
In his autobiography Moon River and Me: A Memoir, Williams describes how Archie Bleyer, the head of his former record label, Cadence Records, had discouraged the singer from recording the song "Moon River" in 1961, assuming that young people wouldn't understand the line "my huckleberry friend". Williams writes, "He thought it was too abstract and didn't think it would be a hit single, so he turned it down." Williams moved on shortly thereafter to Columbia Records, where the powers-that-be loved the idea of an entire album of songs from movies, and he wound up recording the rejected song on January 4, 1962. A few months later he was again offered the chance to sing "Moon River", this time at the Academy Awards on April 9 because of its nomination for Best Original Song.  The April 28 issue of Billboard magazine reported that the album had "racked up orders, according to Columbia Records, of close to 40,000 within two weeks' release. Platter was rushed out by the label to coincide with Williams' performance of the Mancini tune on the Academy Awards Show a fortnight ago."

Reception
William Ruhlmann of Allmusic felt that Williams did a "masterful version" of the title track and "also does well with the rest of the songs," calling the album "a highlight in the singer's career."

In 2022, Williams' rendition of Moon River was selected for preservation in the Library of Congress.

Track listing

Side one
 "Love Is a Many-Splendored Thing" from Love Is a Many-Splendored Thing (Sammy Fain, Paul Francis Webster) – 2:55
 "The Theme from A Summer Place" from A Summer Place (Mack Discant, Max Steiner) – 2:38
 "Maria" from West Side Story (Leonard Bernstein, Stephen Sondheim) – 3:43
 "Never on Sunday" from Never on Sunday (Manos Hadjidakis, Billy Towne) – 3:02
 "As Time Goes By" from Everybody's Welcome (Herman Hupfeld) – 3:11
 "The Exodus Song (This Land Is Mine)" from Exodus (Pat Boone, Ernest Gold) – 3:16

Side two
 "Moon River" from Breakfast at Tiffany's (Henry Mancini, Johnny Mercer) – 2:46
 "Tonight" from West Side Story (Leonard Bernstein, Stephen Sondheim) – 2:37
 "The Second Time Around" from High Time (Sammy Cahn, Jimmy Van Heusen) – 3:23
 "Tender Is the Night" from Tender Is the Night (Fain, Webster) – 3:05
 "It Might as Well Be Spring" from State Fair (Oscar Hammerstein II, Richard Rodgers) –3:11
 "Three Coins in the Fountain" from Three Coins in the Fountain (Cahn, Jule Styne) – 2:55

Personnel
From the liner notes for the original album:

Robert Mersey – arranger, conductor, producer
Andy Williams - vocals

References

Bibliography

1962 albums
Andy Williams albums
Columbia Records albums